Ambewadi is a small village in the Igatpuri of Maharashtra, India. It is located in the ambewadi taluka.

Nashik

Demographics 

According to the 2011 census of India, Ambewadi has 23 households. The effective literacy rate (i.e. the literacy rate of population excluding children aged 6 and below) is 54.9%.

References 

Villages in Dahanu taluka